S. crispa may refer to:
 Saussurea crispa, a snow lotus species in the genus Saussurea
 Schomburgkia crispa, a large sized, hot growing plant species
 Sophronitis crispa, an orchid species
 Sparassis crispa, a mushroom species
 Stellaria crispa, a chickweed species

See also
 Crispa (disambiguation)